McKenzie Elise Adams (born February 13, 1992) is an American professional volleyball player who plays as a outside hitter for Italian Series A1 team Igor Gorgonzola Novara. She played collegiately at the Virginia for one season before transferring and finishing her career out at UTSA, where she became the first ever All-American in the program's history.

Personal life
Adams originates from Schertz, Texas and attended high school at Steele High School. She was a first-team all-state honoree and ranked as the national No. 24 recruit in her graduating class.

Career

College

Adams played one season of college volleyball at Virginia. She earned accolades such as NCAA East Region, Atlantic Coast Conference and Virginia Sports Information Directors Freshman of the Year. She posted 265 kills and had over 100 digs on the season. She completed her final three seasons at the University of Texas, San Antonio. In her first season with UTSA, she was named the Southland Conference Newcomer of the Year and first-team All-Southland. During her junior season in 2012, she became the first All-American in program history after earning honorable mention All-America honor. She was also named to AVCA All-West Region, was the Western Athletic Conference Player of the Year and first-team All-WAC. She ranked second in the conference and 24th in the nation with 4.33 kills per set, and was fourth in the league with 3.84 assists per set. She finished the season as the 30th ranked national player in points per set (4.85).

Professional clubs
 Indias de Mayagüez (2014–2015)
 Ladies in Black Aachen (2016–2018)
 SSC Schwerin (2018–2020)
 Imoco Volley Conegliano (2020–2021)
 Eczacıbaşı Dynavit(2021–2022)
 Igor Gorgonzola Novara (2022–present)

Awards and honors

Clubs

 2021-2022 CEV Cup –  Champions, with Eczacıbaşı Dynavit
 2021–2022 Turkish League –  Bronze medal, with Eczacıbaşı Dynavit
 2021–2022 Turkish Cup –  Bronze medal, with Eczacıbaşı Dynavit
 2021–2022 Turkish Super Cup –  Silver, with Eczacıbaşı Dynavit
 2020–2021 CEV Champions League –  Champions, with Imoco Volley Conegliano
 2020–2021 Italian Super Cup –  Champions, with Imoco Volley Conegliano
 2020–2021 Italian Cup –  Champions, with Imoco Volley Conegliano
 2019–2020 German Super Cup –  Champions, with SSC Schwerin
 2018–2019 German Super Cup –  Champions, with SSC Schwerin
 2018–2019 German Bundesliga –  Silver medal, with SSC Schwerin
 2014–2015 Puerto Rican League –  Silver medal, with Indias de Mayagüez

Individual awards

Club
 2019–2020 German Super Cup – Most Valuable Player

College

AVCA All-American (Honorable Mention, 2013))
Western Athletic Conference Player of the Year (2012)

External links

CEV profile

References

1992 births
Living people
Sportspeople from Texas
Outside hitters
American women's volleyball players
Virginia Cavaliers women's volleyball players
American expatriate sportspeople in Germany
American expatriate sportspeople in Turkey
American expatriate sportspeople in Italy
Expatriate volleyball players in Germany
Expatriate volleyball players in Italy
Expatriate volleyball players in Turkey
Serie A1 (women's volleyball) players
Eczacıbaşı volleyball players